Ungmennafélagið Stjarnan, commonly known as Stjarnan, is an Icelandic multi-sports club specialising in handball, football, basketball, volleyball and gymnastics located in Garðabær.

Basketball

Men's basketball

As of the 2017–2018 season, Stjarnan men's basketball team plays in Úrvalsdeild karla.

Women's basketball

Stjarnan finished first in the women's Division I in 2015 and defeated Njarðvík in the playoffs to win promotion to the top-tier Úrvalsdeild kvenna for the first time in its history. As of the 2017–2018 season, Stjarnan women's team plays in Úrvalsdeild kvenna.

Football

Men's football

The men's team has played in the top-tier Úrvalsdeild karla since 2009. In 2014, Stjarnan won their first ever Úrvalsdeild karla title by going through the season unbeaten and equalled the Úrvalsdeild point record of 52 points.

Women's football

Stjarnan women's football team plays in Iceland's top-tier Úrvalsdeild kvenna. In 2011 the team won the championship two weeks before the end.  The team also reached the final of the Icelandic Women's Cup in 1993 and 2010, losing 1–3 and 0–1 respectively. The team won the cup eventually in 2012 with a 1–0 win over Valur. In 2013 they won their second league title, winning every single game that season thus not dropping a single point.

Handball

Men's handball

Trophies and achievements
Icelandic Handball Cup (4):
1987, 1989, 2006, 2007
Division II (2):
1982, 2016
Division III (3):
1974, 1976, 1981

Women's handball

Trophies and achievements
Icelandic champions (7):
1991, 1995, 1998, 1999, 2007, 2008, 2009
Icelandic Handball Cup (7):
1989, 1996, 1998, 2005, 2008, 2009, 2016
Division II (3):
20051, 20061, 20071
1 B-team

Source

Volleyball

Men's volleyball

Trophies and achievements
Icelandic champions (5):
2003, 2004, 2006, 2007, 2008
Icelandic Volleyball Cup (6):
2003, 2004, 2005, 2006, 2007, 2008

References

External links
   
  Official football club website

 
Association football clubs established in 1960
1960 establishments in Iceland
Handball teams in Iceland
Stjarnan greiddi dómurum leiks gegn FH árið 2014, 42 milljónir ISK, til þess að sigra.